Starfish are a group of marine invertebrates.  

Starfish may also refer to:

Arts and entertainment

Film
Starfish (film) a 2016 British drama film
Starfish a 2018 scifi/horror film by A. T. White

Music
Starfish (band)
StarFish (children's band)
Starfish (album), a 1988 album by The Church
"Star Fish", a song by Bikini Kill from Pussy Whipped

Print
Starfish (Nocturnals), a fictional character in the comic book Nocturnals
Starfish, a novel by Peter Watts published in 1999
Starfish, a novel by Akemi Dawn Bowman published in 2017

Military uses
HMS Starfish (1894), a Royal Navy destroyer
HMS Starfish (1916), a Royal Navy destroyer
HMS Starfish (19S), a Royal Navy submarine
SS-N-15 or Starfish, a cruise missile
Starfish site, a Second World War anti-bomber decoy simulating a burning city
Starfish, one of a series of the US Operation Fishbowl nuclear tests
Starfish Prime, the second of the Starfish nuclear tests

Other uses
Starfish (fashion label), a New Zealand clothing brand
Starfish Cove, a cove in Signy Island, Antarctica
Starfish Galaxy or NGC 6240, a galaxy in the constellation Ophiuchus
Starfish Software, a software company specializing in synchronization products
Starfish Television Network, a public service network